Overlaying or overlying is the act of accidentally smothering a child to death by rolling over them in sleep.

Alleged instances of overlaying were perceived to be one common way of covering up infanticide in Victorian England. Many wet nurses were accused of this, and in many counties the wet nurse would have to provide a crib out of her own money to ensure that she would not sleep with the child.

The London coroner Athelstan Braxton Hicks noted that "during the last ten months no less than 500 cases had occurred in which children had been suffocated while in bed with their parents, in London alone." He estimated that a third of the allegedly accidental deaths of children were due to suffocations. Overcrowded conditions often led to overlaying and in another case he noted "it was no use reading the father a lesson on sleeping in a crowded room, for he was hard-up and could not pay for large apartments. The jury returned a verdict of "Accidental death," and expressed its opinion that the father had done the best he could in the circumstances."

In researching smothering deaths by black slaves in the American South, which occurred nine times more frequently than in white families, Michael P. Johnson suggests that sudden infant death syndrome was in fact to blame (which, if it happened in white families, would be heavily underreported because of the social stigma attached).

See also
Judgment of Solomon, following an incident of overlaying

References 

Infant mortality
Manslaughter